Kanoko Tsutani-Mabuchi (津谷-馬淵 鹿乃子, born January 6, 1938) is a retired Japanese diver who won five medals in the 3 m springboard and 10 platform events at the Asian Games in 1954–74. Together with her husband Ryo Mabuchi she competed in the springboard and platform at the 1956, 1960 and 1964 Summer Olympics and placed 7th–16th. Her daughter Yoshino Mabuchi also became an Olympic diver.

References

1938 births
Living people
Olympic divers of Japan
Divers at the 1956 Summer Olympics
Divers at the 1960 Summer Olympics
Divers at the 1964 Summer Olympics
Japanese female divers
Asian Games medalists in diving
Divers at the 1954 Asian Games
Divers at the 1958 Asian Games
Divers at the 1970 Asian Games
Divers at the 1974 Asian Games
Asian Games gold medalists for Japan
Asian Games bronze medalists for Japan
Medalists at the 1954 Asian Games
Medalists at the 1958 Asian Games
Medalists at the 1970 Asian Games
Medalists at the 1974 Asian Games
20th-century Japanese women